Henri Gault (4 November 1929 - 9 July 2000) was a French food journalist. He was co-founder of the Gault Millau guides with Christian Millau, and invented the phrase "nouvelle cuisine", though later he claimed to regret it.

References

1929 births
2000 deaths
French male writers
20th-century French male writers
French food writers
Restaurant critics